Psyttala is a genus of insects belonging to the assassin bugs. The name is commonly misspelled as Psytalla (e.g.).

Species
 Psyttala ducalis  (Westwood, 1845) 
 Psyttala dudgeoni  Distant, 1919 
 Psyttala horrida  (Stål, 1865) 
 Psyttala incognita  Distant, 1919 
 Psyttala johnstoni  Distant, 1919 
 Psyttala samwelli  Distant, 1919

References

Reduviidae